Marko Tkalec (born 17 March 1977) is a retired professional tennis player from Slovenia. He achieved a career-high singles ranking of World No. 243 in 2002. Tkalec has participated in 22 Davis Cup ties for Slovenia, posting a 25–9 record in singles and a 3–4 record in doubles.

Futures titles (20)

References

External links
 
 

1977 births
Slovenian male tennis players
Sportspeople from Maribor
Living people